Moshe Yegar (born 30 October 1930, Buenos Aires) is an Israeli retired diplomat and historian of Islam in Southeast Asia; also, he is author of books and research articles on the history of Zionism during the British Mandate, and about Israel's Ministry of Foreign Affairs and its policies and activities.

Early life
Yegar's father, Jacob Yegar, was born in 1902 in Galinianitz, a small town in Galicia (Eastern Europe). He studied in the Jewish Seminar for Teachers in Lvov and became a teacher for Jewish subjects. In 1929, he married Chava Klein and together they moved to Buenos Aires, where, a year later, they had their son, Moshe. Jacob Yegar, his brother-in-law Moshe Klein and a local teacher, established the first Hebrew school, named in honor of Hayim Nahman Bialik, in Buenos Aires, Argentine. The school has existed ever since.  In 1935, the Yegar's family immigrated to Eretz-Israel and settled in Haifa. Yegar went to the Hebrew Reali School of Haifa. He continued his studies at the Hebrew university in Jerusalem where he received his B.A, M.A. and Ph.D. degrees. He specialized in the History of Islamic Peoples.
In the years 1946 - 1948, Yegar was a member in the Hagana ,  the largest paramilitary Jewish organization in the  British mandate; later on, in the years 1949 - 1955, he served as an officer in the Israel Defense Forces, the military forces of Israel, and was discharged with a rank of Major.

Career as a diplomat
In 1956, Yegar joined Israel's Ministry of Foreign Affairs where he served until his retirement in November 1995. Among his posts abroad, he served at the Embassy of Israel in Rangoon, Burma (now known as  Yangon, Myanmar); as Consul at Israel's Consulate General in Los Angeles (1966 - 1969); as Consul General in Philadelphia (1969 - 1972); as Consul General in New-York (1985 - 1988); as Ambassador in Stockholm (1988 - 1990); and as Ambassador in Prague (1994 - 1995). Also, in 1965, Yegar was sent to Kuala Lumpur, Malaysia, which had no diplomatic relations with Israel, to open semi-diplomatic presence under cover of a business office. After one year, Yegar was requested to close the office and move out of Malaysia.

In between assignments abroad, Yegar served in the Ministry's Headquarters in Jerusalem in senior positions: Head of the Information Department (Hasbara, in Hebrew) (1975 - 1978); Deputy Director General and Head of the Division for Information and Communication (1980 - 1985); Deputy Director General in charge of Asia, Africa, and Oceania (1990 - 1993).
Yegar showed his capabilities as organizer of large complicated festivities, on two special occasions:
(a) While in his service in New-York, Yegar chaired the 40th Anniversary public committee which organized a mammoth celebration attended by thousands;
(b) While in Prague, Yegar organized "the Old Testament in the Arts Festival, October 1955", which included scores of musical, theatrical events, exhibitions, films and symposia.

Yegar's role in the normalization of relations between India and Israel
Yegar fulfilled a significant role in the negotiations with the Indian authorities to normalize the diplomatic relations between India and Israel. He described in a long article the process, the discussions and the breakthrough which culminated in full diplomatic relations between the two countries. The article appeared in India in the Indian Defence Review, an important quarterly Journal in English on foreign policy and national security issues.

Academia
As an expert and author of books and research articles on Southeast Asia, Yegar was invited by the Hebrew University to teach a course on the political history of Southeast Asia. He did that for nine years.
Yegar is a Research Fellow at the Abba Eban Centre for Israeli Diplomacy at the Hebrew University's Harry S. Truman Research Institute in Jerusalem.

Awards
 In 1994, Yegar received from the Czech National Academy of Science, the Palacky Gold Medal, for his research of Islam in Southeast Asia, the Muslim community of Burma in particular (including the Rohingya).
 In 2013, Yegar received from the Institute for Asia and the Pacific, in New Delhi, India, the Prof. M.L. Sondhi Prize for International Politics, "for his pivotal role in the establishment of full diplomatic relations between India and Israel which enabled these two important Asian democracies to enjoy a rich and variegated, mutually beneficial and expanding relationship"(words inscribed on the Prize).
 Recipient of the Jabotinsky Prize for Literature and Research for 2019.

Public Roles
 Chairman, Beit Agnon in Jerusalem (3 years)
 Chairman, The Jerusalem Baroque Orchestra
 Chairman, The Institute for the Translation of Hebrew Literature, Jerusalem

Publications
Yegar published twenty books on Islam in Southeast Asia and on matters of Israel's foreign policy and on Zionist history, mostly in Hebrew and English. Three of his books were translated to other languages: Arabic, Czech and Burmese. Yegar wrote many articles in Israeli periodicals and journals on historical personalities and events as well as on current issues. In addition, he translated from English into Hebrew eight books of legends and folk-tales for children.

Selected books 
 The Muslims of Burma - A Study of a Minority Group, Wiesbaden: Otto Harrassowitz, 1972; 157 pages (note: this book was published also in Burmese in Yangon (2002) and in Bengali (2022));
 Islam and Islamic Institutions in British Malaya - Policies and Implementation, Jerusalem: Magnes Press, the Hebrew University of Jerusalem, 1979; 312 pages, 
 Neutral Policy - Theory versus Practice: Swedish-Israeli Relations, Jerusalem: Israel Council on Foreign Relations, 1993
 Malaysia Attempts at Dialogue with a Muslim State: Magness Press, Hebrew University of Jerusalem, 1996, 236 pages; [in Hebrew] 
 Between Integration and Secession - The Muslim communities of the Southern Philippines, Southern Thailand, and Western Burma/Myanmar, Lanham, Boulder, New-York. Oxford: Lexington Books, 2002
 A Short History of Southeast Asia in Modern Times: Magness Press, Hebrew University of Jerusalem, 2008, 308 pages; [in Hebrew] 
 Israel in Asia: Selected Essays.  Jerusalem: Yuvalim Press, 2016
  Co-Author with Dvorah Barzilay-Yegar, The "Uganda" Crisis in Zionism", Carmel Publishing, Jerusalem, 2020, 330 pages; [in Hebrew] 
 The Beginning of Israel's Foreign Service 1948 - 1967, Jerusalem: Carmel Publishing, 2021, 465 pages, [in Hebrew] 
 The History of the Political Department of the Jewish Agency, Jerusalem: The Jewish Library, 2011, 588 pages, [in Hebrew]

Family
Yegar is married to Dr. Dvorah Barzilay-Yegar, historian, who specialized in the life and works of Dr. Chaim Weizmann, the first President of Israel. He has a son and a daughter.

References

External links
 A list of fifteen published books by Moshe Yegar in English and in Hebrew in Stanford University library catalog

1930 births
Haganah members
Argentine emigrants to Mandatory Palestine
Israeli historians
Hebrew University of Jerusalem alumni
Living people
Ambassadors of Israel to Sweden
Ambassadors of Israel to the Czech Republic